Julia Richter (born 14 August 1970, in East Berlin) is a German film and TV actress. She trained at Berlin's Friedrichstadt-Palast ensemble and won the Hersfeld-Preis in 1996.

Selected filmography
, 1995
Just the Beginning, 2000
Sumo Bruno, 2000, German comedy drama film, directed by Lenard Fritz Krawinkel
Julie's Spirit, 2002, Focus Films, directed by Bettina Wilhelm and starring Sylvie Testud and Julia Richter
Learning Her Secrets, 2003 
Raju, 2012, live action short film, directed by Max Zahle

References

External links

1970 births
Living people
German film actresses